Van Dyk or Vandyk is an Afrikaans toponymic meaning "from (the) dike". It can also be directly derived from the Dutch form Van Dijk.
The Czech surname Dyk has a patronymic origin in the given name Benedikt.People with these names include:

Van Dyk
 Carl Vandyk (1851–1931), German-born British photographer
 Dan Van Dyk (1942–2004), American Washington state representative
 Ernst Van Dyk (born 1973), South African wheelchair athlete
 Hans van Dyk (born 1982), South African rugby player
 Irene van Dyk (born 1972), South African-born New Zealand netball player
 Jo-Ane van Dyk (born 1997), South African javelin thrower
 Johan van Dyk (born 1994), South African cricketer.
 Joost van Dyk (died c.1631), Dutch privateer
 Kendall Van Dyk (born 1980), American Montana state senator
 Kobus van Dyk (born 1994), South African rugby player
 Leanne Van Dyk (born 1955), American reformed theologian
 Maks van Dyk (born 1992), South African rugby player
 Manie van Dyk (born 1955), South African politician
 Mitchell Van Dyk (born 1990), American football offensive tackle
 Paul van Dyk (born 1971), German electronic dance music DJ, musician and record producer
 Reed Van Dyk, American short film maker
Dyk
 Ian Dyk (born 1985), Australian race driver
 Robert Dyk (1937–2008), American journalist
Ruth Dyk (1901–2000), American suffragist, psychologist and author
 Sebastian Dyk (born 1992), Swedish ice hockey player
 Timothy B. Dyk (born 1937), American judge
 Viktor Dyk (1877–1931), Czech poet, writer and politician

See also
 DYK (disambiguation)
 Van Dijk
 Van Dyck (surname)
 Van Dyke (disambiguation)

References

Afrikaans-language surnames
Surnames of Dutch origin